The Ngemba languages are a group of Eastern Grassfields languages of the Western High Plateau of Cameroon.

The languages are Awing (Mbwe'wi), Bafut–Beba, Bambili Mbeligi, Mbui Bambui, Mendankwe-Nkwen–Mankon–Mundum (Ngemba), Pinyin, Alatening, Chomba, Mbetu'u, Akum.

In the West and North West regions of Cameroon, languages are often referred to by the name of the village or town where they are spoken. For example, Ghomálá is a Bamileke language spoken in Batié, in the West Province of Cameroon, and is referred to as Batié.

References

 
Languages of Cameroon
Eastern Grassfields languages